Muhammad Fairuzizuan Mohd Tazari (born 5 February 1983) is a former male badminton player from Malaysia.

Career

2007
Mohd Fairuzizuan played at the 2007 BWF World Championships in men's doubles with Mohd Zakry Abdul Latif. They were seeded #7 and were defeated in the second round by Guo Zhendong and Xie Zhongbo, of China, 21–14, 21–13.

At the 2007 China Open Super Series they beat the tournament number two seeded, Cai Yun and Fu Haifeng, in three sets in the first round. However, in the same round of the next Super Series, the Hong Kong Super Series, Mohd Fairuzizuan and Mohd Zakry were forced to bid an early farewell by the same rivals.

2008
In the Thomas Cup semi-finals between Malaysia and China at Jakarta, due to exclusion of the original first doubles, Choong Tan Fook-Lee Wan Wah, due to injury reasons, the original second doubles, Koo Kien Keat-Tan Boon Heong, was lined up as the first doubles and the unseeded Mohd Fairuzizuan and Mohd Zakry were lined up as the second doubles. At that time, Malaysia scored a point through the first singles while China scored 2 points through the first doubles and second singles. Despite being greenhorns in the Thomas Cup, what more facing opponents Xie Zhongbo-Guo Zhendong, Fairuzizuan-Zakry led a fierce fight and scored the 2nd point for Malaysia, defeating the Chinese pair, balancing the points at 2-2. However, Malaysia was eventually defeated through the third singles.

In Singapore Open in June, Fairuzizuan-Zakry faced fellow country comrades, Gan Teik Chai-Lin Woon Fui, in the men's doubles finals. Defeating Gan-Lin by two straight sets, Fairuzizuan-Zakry's win of the men's doubles finals can be almost considered as the starting of the peak of their badminton career.

Achievements

World Championships 
Men's doubles

World Cup 
Men's doubles

Asian Games 
Mixed doubles

Asian Championships 
Men's doubles

Mixed doubles

Southeast Asian Games 
Men's doubles

IBF World Grand Prix/BWF Super Series/BWF Grand Prix Gold 
Men's doubles

  BWF Superseries tournament
 Grand Prix Gold Tournament
 Grand Prix Tournament
 IBF World Grand Prix tournament

References

External links
 

1983 births
Living people
People from Perak
Malaysian male badminton players
Malaysian people of Malay descent
Badminton players at the 2006 Asian Games
Asian Games bronze medalists for Malaysia
Asian Games medalists in badminton
Medalists at the 2006 Asian Games
Competitors at the 2009 Southeast Asian Games
Southeast Asian Games silver medalists for Malaysia
Southeast Asian Games bronze medalists for Malaysia
Southeast Asian Games medalists in badminton